The 1908 Harvard Crimson football team was an American football that represented Harvard University as an independent during the 1908 college football season. In their first season under head coach Percy Haughton, the Crimson finished with a 9–0–1 record, shut out eight of ten opponents, and outscored all opponents by a total of 132 to 8.

There were no polls at the time to determine a national championship. However, in later analyses, Harvard was recognized as the 1908 national champion by the Billingsley Report. Most of the later analyses (Helms Athletic Foundation, Houlgate System, Parke H. Davis) designated Penn as the national champion. The National Championship Foundation chose Penn and LSU as co-national champions.

Three Harvard players were consensus first-team picks on the 1908 All-America college football team: halfback Hamilton Corbett; center Charles Nourse; and tackle Hamilton Fish III. Five other Harvard players also received All-American honors: quarterback Johnny Cutler (first-team honors from The New York Times and The Christian Science Monitor, second-team from Walter Camp); halfback Ernest Ver Wiebe (first-team honors from The Christian Science Monitor, second-team from Camp); end Gilbert Goodwin Browne (first-team honors from Philadelphia Press); tackle Robert McKay (first-team from The Christian Science Monitor); and guard Samuel Hoar (first-team from New York World, Tad Jones, and Philadelphia Press).

Schedule

References

Harvard
Harvard Crimson football seasons
College football national champions
College football undefeated seasons
Harvard Crimson football
1900s in Boston